TCL is a small (~21 kDa) signaling G protein (more specifically a GTPase), and is a member of the Rho family of GTPases.,.

TCL (TC10-like) shares 85% and 78% amino acid similarity to TC10 and Cdc42, respectively. TCL mRNA is 2.5 kb long and is mainly expressed in heart. In vitro, TCL shows rapid GDP/GTP exchange and displays higher GTP dissociation and hydrolysis rates than TC10. Like other Rac/Cdc42/RhoUV members, GTP-bound TCL interacts with CRIB domains, such as those found in PAK and WASP. TCL produces large and dynamic F-actin-rich ruffles on the dorsal cell membrane in REF-52 fibroblasts. TCL activity is blocked by dominant negative Rac1 and Cdc42 mutants, suggesting a cross-talk between these three Rho GTPases.

TCL is unrelated to TCL1A, a proto-oncogene implicated in the development of T-Cell Leukemias.

See also
TCL1A

References

G proteins